Sabrina Wanjiku Simader (born 13 April 1998) is an alpine skier from Kenya.

Personal life
Simader was born in Kenya and moved to Austria when she was three years old, where she picked up the sport. Her mother is Kenyan while her Stepfather is Austrian.

Career

2016 Winter Youth Olympics
Simader represented Kenya at the Winter Youth Olympics in 2016 in Lillehammer, Norway.

2018 Winter Olympics
Simader competed for Kenya at the 2018 Winter Olympics in the alpine skiing events. Simader became the first female and alpine skier to compete for Kenya at the Winter Olympics. Simader is aiming for a top 20 finish in her events.

World Cup results

Results per discipline

Standings through 29 January 2023

World Championship results

Olympic results

Other results

European Cup results

Season standings

Results per discipline

Standings through 7 February 2023

References

External links
 
 

1998 births
Kenyan female alpine skiers
Living people
Austrian people of Kenyan descent
Kenyan people of Austrian descent
Alpine skiers at the 2018 Winter Olympics
Olympic alpine skiers of Kenya
Alpine skiers at the 2016 Winter Youth Olympics